III is an IDM album by Download.

Track listing
 "Toooly Hooof" – 4:36
 "Cunning" – 6:02
 "Moth" – 6:59
 "Tunnel" – 3:49
 "Mzeo B" – 4:31
 "Streaked" – 4:33
 "Flight of the Luminous Insects" – 6:11
 "Beauty in the Eyes" – 6:12
 "Seeeping Solus" – 6:21
 "Pleck" – 4:29
 "Bellshaw" – 4:39
 "Were" – 4:18

Personnel
cEvin Key
Philth
Anthony Valcic

Additional musicians
Peggy Lee – cello, 12
J. Vizary – keys, 8
Tim Hill – electronics, 7
Russell Nash – cylon sequencer design, 7

Design
Dave McKean - artwork and photography

References

Download (band) albums
1997 albums
Albums with cover art by Dave McKean